John Watters (born 24 February 1955) is an Australian former cyclist. He competed in the individual road race and the team time trial events at the 1984 Summer Olympics.

References

External links
 

1955 births
Living people
Australian male cyclists
Olympic cyclists of Australia
Cyclists at the 1984 Summer Olympics
Place of birth missing (living people)
Commonwealth Games medallists in cycling
Commonwealth Games silver medallists for Australia
Cyclists at the 1982 Commonwealth Games
Medallists at the 1982 Commonwealth Games